Obrium clavijoi is a species of beetle in the family Cerambycidae. It was described by Joly in 2010.

References

Obriini
Beetles described in 2010